Calliteara grotei is a species of moth of the family Erebidae. It is found in Asia in the Himalayas, southwestern India and in Southeast Asia.

References

Lymantriinae
Moths described in 1859
Moths of Asia